Ali Haidar or similar spellings, is a male Muslim given name, meaning "Ali the lion", in reference to the reputed bravery of the fourth caliph, Ali. Notable bearers of the name include:

People
Ali Haidar (VC) (1913–1999), Pakistani Pashtun soldier
Ali Haydar (Syrian army officer) (1932–2022), Syrian army officer
Ali Haidar (politician) (born 1962), Syrian politician 
Ali Haider (singer) (born 1967), Pakistani singer and actor
Ali Haider (cricketer) (born 1988), Pakistani cricketer
Ali Haidar (basketball) (born 1990), Canadian basketball player of Lebanese origin 
Ali Haider Multani (1690–1785), Punjabi Sufi poet
Ali Haider Tabatabai (1854–1933), Urdu poet, translator and scholar of languages
ʿAlī Ḥaydar Pāshā (1866–1935), Ottoman politician and Emir and Grand Sharif of Mecca 1916–17
Ali Haider Khan (1900–1963), Bengali noble, Nawab and Minister in British India
Ali Haydar Saltık (1923–2011), Turkish general
Ali Haydar Şen (born 1939), Turkish sports administrator
Ali Haydar Konca (born 1950), Turkish politician
Ali Haider Noor Khan Niazi (born 1978), Pakistani politician
Ali Haydar Hakverdi (born 1979), Turkish politician
Hissam Ali Haider (born 1982), Pakistani polo player
Agha Ali Haidar, Pakistani politician
Ali Haider Zaidi, Pakistani politician
Ali Haider Gillani, son of former Prime Minister of Pakistan who was kidnapped
Ali Haider Ibne Azhar Fareed, youngest therapist over all the world from Pakistan

Other uses
BNS Ali Haider, ships of the Bangladesh Navy

See also
Haidar Ali (disambiguation)
Ali Sher (disambiguation)

Arabic masculine given names